National Route A011 is a road in the east of Formosa Province, Argentina. From the junction of National Route 3 on km marker 1,287 in Clorinda until the small village of Puerto Pilcomayo on the right bank of the Paraguay River, it runs for a length of  all paved, numbered from km markers 1,287 to 1,298.

This road was part National Route 11 before, but due to the construction of the Puente internacional San Ignacio de Loyola it was renamed.

Towns
The towns crossed on its length from NW to SE are the following:
Clorinda (km 1287)
Garcete Cué (km 1290)
Puerto Pilcomayo (km 1298)

National roads in Formosa Province
Tourism in Argentina